Prince Karl Alfred of Liechtenstein (Karl Alfred Maria Johannes Baptista Heinrich Aloys Georg Hartmann Ignatius; 16 August 1910 – 17 November 1985) was a prince and brother of Franz Joseph II. He was the third child and second son of Prince Aloys of Liechtenstein and Archduchess Elisabeth Amalie of Austria.

He married on 17 February 1949, at Persenbeug Castle in Austria, Archduchess Agnes Christina of Austria (14 December 1928 – 31 August 2007). She was the second child and eldest daughter of Archduke Hubert Salvator of Austria and Princess Rosemary of Salm-Salm.

They had seven children:
 Prince Dominik Volkmar Hubert Alois Maria Joseph Thaddäus Thomas Paulus Karl Ignatius Silverius (b. 20 June 1950, in Vienna – 20 September 2009, in Vienna), married at Spitz an der Donau on 9 October 1980 Eva Maria Lösch (4 July 1943, in Vienna – 24 February 1998, in Vienna), daughter of Otto Lösch and wife Hildegard Freiin von Felder, without issue
 Prince Andreas Duarte Emanuel Ulrich Benedikt Joseph Maria Karl Rafael Ignatius Mathias Paulus (b. 25 February 1952, in Vienna), married in Madrid on 29 September 1978 Silvia Prieto y Figueroa (b. 2 May 1952, in Madrid), daughter of Luis Prieto y Calle and wife Olimpia Figueroa y ..., without issue
 Prince Gregor Heinrich Augustinus Judas Thaddäus Joseph Maria Pius Paulus Antonius Stephan Salvator (b. 18 April 1954, in Vienna), unmarried and without issue
 Princess Alexandra Maria Christina Aloisia Ulrike Henriette Agnes Ignatia Pia Gabriela Anastasia (25 December 1955, in Vienna – 27 February 1993, in Vienna), married in Vienna on 20 September 1980 and divorced in 1988 Hans Lovrek (b. 11 January 1955, in Vienna), son of Heribert Lovrek and wife Pauline Lerner, without issue
 Princess Maria Pia Ludovika Ulrika Elisabeth Paschaline Katharina Ignazia Lucia Johanna Josefa (b. 6 August 1960, in Vienna), married in Vienna on 4 August 1995 Max Alexander Kothbauer (b. 30 March 1950), and had an only son:
 Hieronymus Max Alexander Karl-Alfred Alfons Michael Kothbauer (b. 26 January 1997, in Vienna)
 Princess Katharina Maria Christina Henriette Valerie Agnes (b. 27 January 1964, in Vienna), married firstly civilly in London on 16 November 1991 and religiously in Vienna on 30 November 1991 and divorced in 2002 Jeremy Kelton (b. 21 October 1960, in London), son of Michael Kelton and wife Joanna Peel, and had an only son, and married secondly in London on 3 December 2005 Andrew Duncan Gammon (b. 15 June 1958), without issue:
 Maximilian Anthony Kelton (b. 15 October 1994, in London)
 Princess Birgitta Ulrike Rosa Marie Elisabeth Aloisia Hermenegilde (b. 13 April 1967, in Vienna), married civilly in Vaduz on 18 December 2000 and religiously at Schloss Persenbeug on 30 December 2000 Otto Graf Jankovich-Bésán de Pribér, Vuchin et Duna-Szekcsö (b. 11 January 1967, in Bad Homburg vor der Höhe), and had issue:
 Arthur Graf Jankovich-Bésán de Pribér, Vuchin et Duna-Szekcsö (b. 17 October 2001, in Vienna)
 Johanna Gräfin Jankovich-Bésán de Pribér, Vuchin et Duna-Szekcsö (b. 27 May 2003, in Vienna)

In 1953, he and his wife were royal guests at the Coronation of Queen Elizabeth II.

Prince Karl Alfred died on 17 November 1985.

Ancestry

References

1910 births
1985 deaths
Princes of Liechtenstein
Burials in Vienna